Hypochrysops architas is a butterfly of the family Lycaenidae endemic to the Solomon Islands. It was first described by Hamilton Herbert Druce in 1891.

Subspecies
H. a. architas H. H. Druce, 1891 (Bougainville, Fauro)
H. a. cratevas H. H. Druce, 1891 (Guadalcanal, Solomon)
H. a. marie Tennent, 2001 (New Georgia, Solomon)
H. a. seuthes H. H. Druce, 1891 (Malaita, Solomon)

References

Luciini